This is a List of schools in Mexicali, Baja California.

According to a previous census conducted by the INEGI (Instituto Nacional de Estadística y Geografía) in 2008, the number of students who have graduated from Mexicali's public and private schools are as follows:

Pre-scholar students: 18,648
Primary school students: 17,272
Secondary school students: 12,337
Technical education students: 531
Baccalaureate students: 6,152

Some public universities in the city include Autonomous University of Baja California, Campus Mexicali, Universidad Politécnica de Baja California and the Instituto Tecnológico de Mexicali. Private universities include Centro de Enseñanza Técnica y Superior, Universidad del Valle de México and Universidad Xochicalco.

Schools
Colegio CIDEA
Autonomous University of Baja California, Campus Mexicali
CETYS Universidad
 Instituto Tecnológico de Mexicali
Universidad De Negocios ESCOMEX
UNIVER Mexicali
Tecnológico de Baja California
Universidad Politécnica De Baja California
Universidad Xochicalco Campus Mexicali
Universidad del Valle de México Campus Mexicali
 Benemérita Escuela Normal Urbana Federal Fronteriza
Colegio de Bachilleres del Estado de Baja California
Instituto Salvatierra Cacita
Bachillerato Universitario
CECyTE
Colegio de las Americas
Instituto Felix De Jesus Rougier
Colegio Anglo Americano de Nuestra Señora de la Paz 
Instituto Pedagógico Auditivo Oral A.C.
Colegio Americano de Mexicali
Colegio Frontera
Escuela Superior de Comercio Exterior

References

Education in Mexicali
Buildings and structures in Baja California